Amaurohydnum is a fungal genus  in the family Meruliaceae. It is a monotypic genus, containing the single resupinate species Amaurohydnum flavidum, found in Australia on Eucalyptus wood and described as new to science in 1978.

References

Fungi of Australia
Meruliaceae
Monotypic Polyporales genera
Fungi described in 1978